CL4, CL-4 or CL.IV may refer to:
 1989 CL4, a synonym for 9911 Quantz, a main belt asteroid orbiting the Sun
 Halberstadt CL.IV, a German ground attack aircraft of World War I
 Hannover CL.IV, a prototype escort fighter built in Germany during World War I
 , the lead ship of Omaha class of light cruiser of the United States Navy